Municipal elections were held in Alberta, Canada on Monday, October 15, 2007. Since 1968, provincial legislation has required every municipality to hold triennial elections. Mayors (reeves), councillors (aldermen), and trustees were elected to office in 15 of the 16 cities, all 111 towns, all 99 villages, all 4 specialized municipalities, all 64 municipal districts, 3 of the 7 improvement districts, and the advisory councils of the 3 special areas. The City of Lloydminster is on the Saskatchewan schedule (every three years), and held elections on October 25, 2006 and October 28, 2009, while 4 improvement districts (Nos. 12, 13, 24, and 25) have no councils and are led solely by the Minister of Municipal Affairs. Since the 2004 municipal elections, the Town of Lac La Biche and Lakeland County amalgamated to form Lac La Biche County, the villages of Irricana and Onoway became towns, the Town of Brooks became a city, and the Village of Sangudo was dissolved.

The 2007 municipal elections featured a plebiscite on the possible amalgamation of the towns of Black Diamond and Turner Valley.

Cities
Bold indicates elected, and incumbents are italicized.

Airdrie

In the 2007 elections, the citizens of Airdrie elected six aldermen (at large), and participated in electing two of the Rocky View School Division's seven trustees (West Airdrie being Ward 7, & East Airdrie being part of Ward 3). All six incumbent aldermen were re-elected, the incumbent mayor had no challengers, and the Calgary Catholic School District's Ward 3/5 incumbent trustee had no challengers.

Brooks

In the 2007 elections, the citizens of Brooks elected one mayor and six councillors (all at large), and participated in electing some of the Grasslands Regional Division No. 6's six trustees, and one of the Christ the Redeemer Catholic Separate Regional Division No. 3's eight trustees. The incumbent mayor Don Weisbeck, did not run.

Calgary

In the 2007 elections, the citizens of Calgary elected one mayor, 12 of their 14 aldermen (one from each of 14 wards), five of the seven Calgary School District trustees (each representing 2 of 14 wards), and three of the seven Calgary Catholic School District trustees (each representing 2 of 14 wards). Two incumbent councillors were unchallenged, two incumbent public school trustees were unchallenged, and four separate school trustee candidates (three being incumbents) were unchallenged.

Camrose

In the 2007 elections, the citizens of Camrose elected eight councillors (at large), two of the Battle River Regional Division No. 31's eight trustees (as Ward Camrose), and one of the Elk Island Catholic Separate Regional Division No. 41's seven trustees (as Ward Camrose). The incumbent mayor had no challengers.

Cold Lake

In the 2007 elections, the citizens of Cold Lake elected one mayor, six councillors (all at large), three of the Northern Lights School Division No. 69's eight trustees (as Ward 2), and three of the Lakeland Roman Catholic Separate School District No. 150's seven trustees (as Ward Cold Lake). The incumbent mayor Allan Buck, did not run.

Edmonton

In the 2007 elections, the citizens of Edmonton elected one mayor, 12 councillors (two from each of six wards), eight of the nine Edmonton Public Schools trustees (one from each of nine wards), and four of the seven Edmonton Catholic School District trustees (one from each of six wards, plus the runner-up). One incumbent public school trustee had no challengers, and three separate school trustee candidates (one being an incumbent) were unchallenged.

Fort Saskatchewan

In the 2007 elections, the citizens of Fort Saskatchewan elected six councillors (at large), two of the Elk Island Public Schools Regional Division No. 14's nine trustees (as Ward Fort Saskatchewan), and one of the Elk Island Catholic Separate Regional Division No. 41's seven trustees (as Ward Fort Saskatchewan). The incumbent mayor had no challengers.

Grande Prairie

In the 2007 elections, the citizens of Grande Prairie elected one mayor, eight aldermen (all at large), the five Grande Prairie School District No. 2357 trustees (at large), and five of the Grande Prairie Roman Catholic Separate School District No. 28's seven trustees (as Ward 1).

Leduc

In the 2007 elections, the citizens of Leduc elected one mayor, six aldermen (all at large), two of the Black Gold Regional Schools' seven trustees (as Ward Leduc), and two of the St. Thomas Aquinas Roman Catholic Separate Regional Division No. 38's nine trustees (one from each of Wards Leduc 1 & Leduc 2).

Lethbridge

In the 2007 elections, the citizens of Lethbridge elected eight aldermen (at large), the seven Lethbridge School District No. 51 trustees (at large), and five of the Holy Spirit Roman Catholic Separate Regional Division No. 4's nine trustees (as Ward 2). The incumbent mayor had no challengers.

Medicine Hat

In the 2007 elections, the citizens of Medicine Hat elected one mayor, eight aldermen (all at large), the five Medicine Hat School District No. 76 trustees (at large), and four of the Medicine Hat Catholic Separate Regional Division No. 20's five trustees (as Ward Medicine Hat).

Red Deer

In the 2007 elections, the citizens of Red Deer elected one mayor, eight councillors (all at large), the seven Red Deer School District No. 104 trustees (at large), and five of the Red Deer Catholic Regional Division No. 39's seven trustees (as Ward Red Deer).

Spruce Grove

In the 2007 elections, the citizens of Spruce Grove elected one mayor, six aldermen (all at large), and two of the Parkland School Division No. 70's seven trustees (as Ward 5). The incumbent mayor Ken Scott, did not run, and the three incumbent Evergreen Catholic Separate Regional Division No. 2 Ward 2 trustees were not challenged (Spruce Grove being part of Ward 2, total nine trustees).

St. Albert

In the 2007 elections, the citizens of St. Albert elected one mayor and six councillors (all at large). The incumbent mayor Paul Chalifoux did not run, and the Greater St. Albert Catholic (Public) Schools' four Ward St. Albert trustees (total seven trustees) and the St. Albert Protestant Separate School Division No. 6's five trustees (at large) were unchallenged.

Wetaskiwin

In the 2007 elections, the citizens of Wetaskiwin elected six aldermen (at large) and three of the Wetaskiwin Regional Division No. 11's eight trustees (as Ward City), and participated in electing two of the St. Thomas Aquinas Roman Catholic Separate Regional Division No. 38's nine trustees (as Ward Wetaskiwin). The incumbent mayor had no challengers.

By-election

After it was announced that Alderman Dave Anderson would be leaving council, a by-election was held on September 15, 2008, to fill the empty seat, only 16.4% of eligible voters turned-out for the vote.

Towns
The following are the available election results for Alberta towns with a population over 8,500, plus the notable town of Slave Lake. Bold indicates elected, and incumbents are italicized.

Beaumont

In the 2007 elections, the citizens of Beaumont elected one mayor, six councillors (all at large), and one of the Black Gold Regional Schools' seven trustees, and participated in electing one of the St. Thomas Aquinas Roman Catholic Separate Regional Division No. 38's nine trustees.

Canmore

In the 2007 elections, the citizens of Canmore elected six councillors (at large), and participated in electing three of the Canadian Rockies Regional Division No. 12's seven trustees, and one of the Christ the Redeemer Catholic Separate Regional Division No. 3's eight trustees. The incumbent mayor had no challengers.

Chestermere

In the 2007 elections, the citizens of Chestermere elected one mayor and six councillors (all at large), and participated in electing one of the Rocky View School Division No. 41's seven trustees, and one of the Calgary Catholic School District's seven trustees. The incumbent mayor Dave Mikkelsen, did not run.

Cochrane

In the 2007 elections, the citizens of Cochrane elected one mayor, six councillors (all at large), and one of the Rocky View School Division's seven trustees. The Calgary Catholic School District's Ward 1/2 incumbent trustee had no challengers.

High River

In the 2007 elections, the citizens of High River elected one mayor, six councillors (all at large), and one of the Foothills School Division No. 38's five trustees, and participated in electing one of the Christ the Redeemer Catholic Separate Regional Division No. 3's eight trustees.

Hinton

In the 2007 elections, the citizens of Hinton elected one mayor and six councillors (all at large), and participated in electing one of the Grande Yellowhead Regional Division No. 35's six trustees, and one of the Evergreen Catholic Separate Regional Division No. 2's eight trustees.

Lacombe

In the 2007 elections, the citizens of Lacombe elected six councillors (at large), and participated in electing two of the Wolf Creek School Division No. 72's six trustees, and one of the St. Thomas Aquinas Roman Catholic Separate Regional Division No. 38's nine trustees. The incumbent mayor had no challengers.

Okotoks

In the 2007 elections, the citizens of Okotoks elected one mayor, six councillors (all at large), and one of the Foothills School Division No. 38's five trustees, and participated in electing one of the Christ the Redeemer Catholic Separate Regional Division No. 3's eight trustees.

Slave Lake

In the 2007 elections, the citizens of Slave Lake elected one mayor and six councillors (all at large), and participated in electing two of the High Prairie School Division No. 48's eight trustees (as Ward 4). The voters were also asked a series of plebiscite questions.

Stony Plain

In the 2007 elections, the citizens of Stony Plain elected one mayor, six councillors (all at large), and one of the Parkland School Division No. 70's seven trustees. The incumbent mayor Donna Cowan, did not run, and the Evergreen Catholic Separate Regional Division No. 2's two Ward 1 trustees were unchallenged.

Strathmore

In the 2007 elections, the citizens of Strathmore elected one mayor, six councillors (all at large), and two of the Golden Hills School Division No. 75's seven trustees, and participated in electing one of the Christ the Redeemer Catholic Separate Regional Division No. 3's eight trustees.

Sylvan Lake

In the 2007 elections, the citizens of Sylvan Lake elected one mayor and six councillors (all at large), and participated in electing one of the Chinook's Edge School Division No. 73's nine trustees. The incumbent mayor Bryan Lambertson, did not run.

Whitecourt

In the 2007 elections, the citizens of Whitecourt elected one mayor and six councillors (all at large), and participated in electing two of the Northern Gateway Regional Division No. 10's nine trustees, and two of the Living Waters Catholic Regional Division No. 42's six trustees.

By-election

After it was announced that Councillors Bob Walker and Nieta World would be leaving council, a by-election was held on May 4, 2009, to fill the empty seats, only 11.5% of eligible voters turned-out for the vote.

Specialized municipalities
The following are the available election results for Alberta specialized municipalities with a population over 20,000, these include the urban service areas of Fort McMurray and Sherwood Park. Bold indicates elected, and incumbents are italicized.

Strathcona County

In the 2007 elections, the citizens of Strathcona elected one mayor, six of their eight councillors (one from each of eight wards, one more than previous), five of the Elk Island Public Schools Regional Division No. 14's nine trustees (3 from Ward Sherwood Park, and 1 from each of Wards Strathcona North & Strathcona South), and four of the Elk Island Catholic Separate Regional Division No. 41's seven trustees (supporters in Sherwood Park). Two of the incumbent councillors were unchallenged.

Wood Buffalo

In the 2007 elections, the citizens of the Regional Municipality of Wood Buffalo elected one mayor, nine of their ten councillors (from four wards), the five Fort McMurray Public School District trustees (in Fort McMurray), and four of the Northland School Division No. 61's 23 school boards (outside Fort McMurray, five trustees each). One incumbent Councillor had no challengers, and the five trustee candidates for the Fort McMurray Roman Catholic Separate School District No. 32 (in Fort McMurray) were unchallenged.

By-election
A by-election was held on June 9, 2008 to fill an empty seat on council.

Municipal districts
The following are the available election results for Alberta municipal districts (counties) with a population over 10,000. Bold indicates elected, and incumbents are italicized.

M.D. of Bonnyville

In the 2007 elections, the citizens of the Municipal District of Bonnyville No. 87 elected one reeve, six councillors (one from each of six wards), and three of the Northern Lights School Division No. 69's nine trustees (as Ward 1), and participated in electing three of the Lakeland Roman Catholic Separate School District No. 150's seven trustees (supporters near Bonnyville). The incumbent reeve Ken Foley, did not run.

Clearwater County

In the 2007 elections, the citizens of Clearwater elected five of their seven councillors (one from each of seven divisions) and two of the Wild Rose School Division No. 66's six trustees (one from each of Wards 3 & 4). Two of the incumbent councillors were unchallenged, and council appointed Division 7 Councillor Patrick Alexander the County Reeve.

M.D. of Foothills

In the 2007 elections, the citizens of the Municipal District of Foothills No. 31 elected seven councillors (one from each of seven divisions) and three of the Foothills School Division No. 38's five trustees (one from each of Wards 1, 2, & 3), and participated in electing two of the Christ the Redeemer Catholic Separate Regional Division No. 3's eight trustees (supporters near High River & Okotoks). Council appointed Division 2 Councillor Roy McLean the County Reeve.

County of Grande Prairie

In the 2007 elections, the citizens of the County of Grande Prairie No. 1 elected four of their nine councillors (one from each of nine divisions) and five of the Peace Wapiti School Division No. 76's nine trustees (one from each of Wards 3, 4, 5, 6, & 7), and participated in electing six of the Grande Prairie Roman Catholic Separate School District No. 28's seven trustees (supporters near Beaverlodge, Grande Prairie, & Sexsmith). Five of the incumbent councillors were unchallenged, and council appointed Division 1 Councillor Everett McDonald the County Reeve.

Lacombe County

In the 2007 elections, the citizens of Lacombe County elected two of their seven councillors (one from each of seven divisions) and three of the Wolf Creek School Division No. 72's six trustees (from Wards 4 & 5), and participated in electing a Wolf Creek trustee from Ward 1, and one of the St. Thomas Aquinas Roman Catholic Separate Regional Division No. 38's nine trustees (supporters near Lacombe). All seven incumbent councillors re-ran, five were unchallenged, and one lost in a tie breaker draw; council appointed Division 7 Councillor Terry Engen the County Reeve.

Leduc County

In the 2007 elections, the citizens of Leduc County elected five of their seven councillors (one from each of seven divisions) and three of the Black Gold Regional Schools' seven trustees (one from each of Wards County West, Central, & East), and participated in electing three of the St. Thomas Aquinas Roman Catholic Separate Regional Division No. 38's nine trustees (supporters near Beaumont & Leduc) and one of the Evergreen Catholic Separate Regional Division No. 2's nine trustees (supporters near Devon). Two of the incumbent councillors were unchallenged, and council appointed Division 2 Councillor Marvin Molzan the Mayor.

County of Lethbridge

In the 2007 elections, the citizens of Lethbridge County elected two of their seven councillors (one from each of seven divisions) and five of the Palliser Regional Division No. 26's six trustees (one from each of five divisions), and participated in electing seven of the Holy Spirit Roman Catholic Separate Regional Division No. 4's nine trustees (supporters near Coaldale, Lethbridge, & Picture Butte). Five of the council candidates were unchallenged (three being incumbents,) and council appointed Division 1 Councillor Lorne Hickey the County Reeve.

Mountain View County

In the 2007 elections, the citizens of Mountain View County elected seven councillors (one from each of seven divisions) and four of the Chinook's Edge School Division No. 73's nine trustees (one from each of Wards 6, 7, 8, & 9). Council appointed Division 7 Councillor Al Kemmere the County Reeve.

Parkland County

In the 2007 elections, the citizens of Parkland County elected one mayor, six councillors (one from each of six divisions), and four of the Parkland School Division No. 70's six trustees (one from each of Wards 1, 2, 4, & 6), and participated in electing five of the Evergreen Catholic Separate Regional Division No. 2's nine trustees (supporters near Spruce Grove & Stony Plain).

Red Deer County

In the 2007 elections, the citizens of Red Deer County elected one mayor (a new position, as a reeve was appointed previously), five of their six councillors (one from each of six divisions, one less than previous), and five of the Chinook's Edge School Division's nine trustees (one from each of Wards 1, 2, 3, 4, & 5). Division 6 had only one council candidate; italicized names in the table indicates individuals who were in council before this election (as the divisions were redistributed).

M.D. of Rocky View

In the 2007 elections, the citizens of Rocky View County elected six of their nine councillors (one from each of nine divisions) and six of the Rocky View School Division's seven trustees (one from each of Wards 1, 2, 3, 4, 5, & 6), and participated in electing three of the Calgary Catholic School District's seven trustees (supporters near Airdrie, Chestermere, & Cochrane). Three of the incumbent councillors were unchallenged, and council appointed Division 7 Councillor Lois Habberfield the County Reeve.

Sturgeon County

In the 2007 elections, the citizens of Sturgeon County elected one mayor, four of their six councillors (one from each of six divisions), and the seven Sturgeon School Division No. 24 trustees (one from each of seven wards). Two of the incumbent councillors were unchallenged.

By-election

After it was announced that Councillor Mark Oberg would be leaving council, a by-election was held on April 27, 2009, to fill the empty seat, only 23.2% of eligible voters turned-out for the vote.

County of Wetaskiwin

In the 2007 elections, the citizens of the County of Wetaskiwin No. 10 elected two of their seven councillors (one from each of seven divisions), and four of the Wetaskiwin Regional Division No. 11's eight trustees (one from each of Wards 1, 2, 3, & 4), and participated in electing two of the St. Thomas Aquinas Roman Catholic Separate Regional Division No. 38's nine trustees (supporters near Wetaskiwin). Five of the incumbent councillors were unchallenged, and council appointed Division 3 Councillor Garry Dearing the County Reeve.

Yellowhead County

In the 2007 elections, the citizens of Yellowhead County elected one mayor, four of their eight councillors (one from each of eight divisions), and four of the Grande Yellowhead Regional Division No. 35's six trustees, and participated in electing one of the Evergreen Catholic Separate Regional Division No. 2's eight trustees (supporters near Hinton) and one of the Living Waters Catholic Regional Division No. 42's six trustees (supporters near Edson). Four of the council candidates (three being incumbents) were unchallenged.

Amalgamation plebiscite

In early 2006, the towns of Black Diamond and Turner Valley initiated discussions on a possible amalgamation of the two municipalities. The discussions culminated in a plebiscite held concurrently with their municipal elections, where the question asked of voters was "Do you support an amalgamation of the Town of Black Diamond and the Town of Turner Valley to form one municipality?" The results of the plebiscite were 66% of Turner Valley voters were in favour of amalgamation, while 71% of Black Diamond voters were against amalgamation.

See also
Canadian electoral calendar, 2007
Municipal elections in Canada

References